Nathan Wallace Newman Trott (born 21 November 1998) is a professional footballer who plays as a goalkeeper for Danish club Vejle Boldklub, on loan from West Ham United.

Born in Bermuda, he has represented both Bermuda and England at youth international level.

Career
Born in Bermuda, Trott joined Valencia's academy in Spain as an outfield player, after being spotted at a satellite academy ran by Valencia at Saltus Grammar School. Trott transitioned to a goalkeeper on international duty with Bermuda under-15's after an injury to Ajai Daniels. Upon his return to Bermuda, Trott joined North Village Rams. In January 2016, Trott joined West Ham United on the recommendation of Clyde Best, and he signed a new four-year contract with the club in March 2019.

Trott moved on loan to AFC Wimbledon in June 2019. He made his debut on 17 August in a 1–1 home draw with Accrington Stanley.

On 23 January 2021, Trott made his debut, as a substitute, for West Ham in a 4–0 FA Cup win against Doncaster Rovers.

In July 2021 he moved on loan to French club Nancy. In August 2022 he moved on loan to Danish club Vejle.

International career
Trott has represented England at U20 level, being a squad member at the 2017 UEFA European Under-19 Championship.

On 30 August 2019, Trott was included in the England U21 squad for the first time.

Career statistics

References

1998 births
Living people
Bermudian footballers
English footballers
West Ham United F.C. players
AFC Wimbledon players
English Football League players
Association football goalkeepers
England youth international footballers
Black British sportsmen
Valencia CF players
North Village Rams players
Bermudian expatriate footballers
Bermudian expatriate sportspeople in Spain
Expatriate footballers in Spain
Bermuda youth international footballers
AS Nancy Lorraine players
Expatriate footballers in France
Bermudian expatriates in France
English expatriate sportspeople in Spain
English expatriates in France
Ligue 2 players
Vejle Boldklub players
English expatriates in Denmark
Bermudian expatriates in Denmark
Expatriate men's footballers in Denmark
Danish 1st Division players
Championnat National 3 players